Adam Comstock (January 18, 1740 – April 10, 1819) was an officer in the American Revolution, and a politician from New York.

Comstock was born on January 18, 1740, in Smithfield, Rhode Island. On April 10, 1763, he married Margaret MacGregor (September 8, 1745 – March 3, 1807) in Cranston, Rhode Island. They had ten children.

Adam Comstock enlisted in 1776 as a Major in Christopher Greene's Rhode Island Regiment and was later promoted to lieutenant colonel . At the Battle of Red Bank in New Jersey, he assumed command when the commanding officer was wounded and won the battle. He also served with Washington's army at Valley Forge.

After the Revolution Comstock moved with his family in 1786 to Corinth, New York and built the first frame house in the town. He was elected to the New York State Assembly from Saratoga County in 1791 and served twelve years. In 1805 he was elected to the New York State Senate and served for four years. He also served as justice of the peace, associate judge of the New York Court of Common Pleas, had a seat on the Council of Appointment, and served as a presidential elector.

Adam Comstock died on April 10, 1819, in South Corinth, New York and is buried in the Comstock Cemetery there.

References

1740 births
1819 deaths
Continental Army officers from Rhode Island
New York (state) state senators
Members of the New York State Assembly
Burials in Saratoga County, New York
People from Corinth, New York
People from Smithfield, Rhode Island
19th-century American politicians